The Tuhutum Monument was an obelisk in Zalău, Romania.

History
The monument was conceived by János Fadrusz after the suggestion of Lajos Szikszai, and opened on September 18, 1902, in the same day with the Wesselényi Monument. It depicted the arrival of the Hungarians, when Tuhutum jumped off his horse and stabbed his spear into the ground symbolizing the landtaking. A turul was also on the top of the monument. The obelisk was located in a park named after Lajos Szikszai, situated between Zalău City Hall and Zalău River. The park was replaced by a parking area. The monument was destroyed during Communist Romania, in a night of the summer of 1968. 

Only a copy of the turul situated on the top of the obelisk was completed in 2008 and placed in the yard of the Reformed Church, Zalău. The obelisk is going to be placed in Iuliu Maniu Square, in Zalău.

Notes and references

External links
 Zilahi képek - Zilah- Régi Tuhutum emlékmû 
 Un monument dispărut
 Întoarcerea Turului întârzie
 Vulturul maghiar se „aseaza” pe toaleta publica din centrul Zalaului 

Buildings and structures completed in 1902
Monuments and memorials in Zalău
1902 in Hungary
János Fadrusz
Obelisks in Romania
Buildings and structures demolished in 1968